Lag windowing is a technique that consists of  windowing the autocorrelation coefficients prior to estimating linear prediction coefficients (LPC). The windowing in the autocorrelation domain has the same effect as a convolution (smoothing) in the power spectral domain and helps in stabilizing the result of the Levinson-Durbin algorithm. The window function is typically a Gaussian function.

External links 
 PLP and RASTA (and MFCC, and inversion) in Matlab

See also 
 Linear predictive coding
 Bandwidth expansion

Autocorrelation
Statistical signal processing